Aogu Wetland is a wetland in Huxi Township, Penghu County, Taiwan.

Geology
The wetland is located on Mount Luojing. It spans over an area of 250 hectares. It is made of various different landscapes, such as gravel, sand, mud, reefs etc.

See also
 List of tourist attractions in Taiwan

References

Landforms of Penghu County
Wetlands of Taiwan